At the 2006 Winter Paralympics, 24 alpine skiing events were contested in Sestriere.

Medal table

Men's events

Women's events

See also
Alpine skiing at the 2006 Winter Olympics

References

 
 
Alpine Skiing Historical Medallists, Official website of Vancouver 2010

 
2006 Winter Paralympics events
Paralympics
2006 Winter Paralympics